Kerala Congress (Nationalist) is a state-level political party in Kerala, India. It was formed on 11 March 2014 through a split from Kerala Congress (M). Its leader is Kuruvilla Mathews.

The party contested the 2014 Indian general election in alliance with the Bharatiya Janata Party-led National Democratic Alliance, with Noble Mathew standing in the Kottayam Lok Sabha constituency.

Split in Kerala Congress (Nationalist) and merger with BJP
Kerala Congress (Nationalist) split into two groups in 2016. One of the split groups was led by Noble Mathew & the other group led by Kuruvilla Mathews.

On 24 January 2016, party Chairman Noble Mathew merged his wing of Kerala Congress (Nationalist) with the Bharatiya Janata Party at a merger ceremony conducted in presence of BJP Kerala State President Kummanam Rajasekharan.

The Kuruvilla Mathews led Kerala congress (Nationalist) is still with the National Democratic Alliance.

References

2014 establishments in Kerala
Indian nationalist political parties
Kerala Congress Parties
Member parties of the National Democratic Alliance
Political parties established in 2014
State political parties in Kerala